An election to Preseli District Council was held in May 1976.   It was preceded by the 1973 election and followed by the 1979 election. On the same day there were elections to the other local authorities and community councils in Wales.

Results

Ambleston (one seat)

Burton (one seat)

Boulston (one seat)

Camrose (one seat)

Clydey and Llanfyrnach (one seat)

Eglwyswrw (one seat)

Fishguard (three seats)

Freystrop and Llangwm (one seat)

Goodwick(one seat)

Haverfordwest Ward One (three seats)

Haverfordwest Ward Two (three seats)

Henry's Moat (one seat)

Johnston (one seat)

Kilgerran and Manordeifi (one seat)

Llanwnda (one seat)

Maenclochog (one seat)

Mathry (one seat)

Milford Haven, Central and East (three seats)

Milford Haven, Hakin and Hubberston (three seats)

Milford Haven, North and West (three seats)

Nevern (one seat)

Newport (one seat)

Neyland (two seats)

St David's (one seat)

St Dogmaels (one seat)

St Ishmaels (one seat)

St Thomas and Haroldson St Issels (one seat)

Steynton (one seat)

Walwyns Castle (one seat)

Whitchurch (one seat)

Wiston (one seat)

References

Preseli Pembrokeshire District Council elections
Preseli District Council election